Renan Dal Zotto (born July 19, 1960) is a Brazilian former volleyball player who competed in three editions of the Summer Olympics and currently head coach of Brazil men's national volleyball team. He was born in São Leopoldo, Rio Grande do Sul.
In 1980 he was part of the Brazilian team which finished fifth in the Olympic tournament. He played five matches.

Four years later he won the silver medal with the Brazilian team in the 1984 Olympic tournament. He played all six matches.
At the 1988 Games he was a member of the Brazilian team which finished fourth in the 1988 Olympic tournament. He played all seven matches.
As coach he worked mostly with clubs in Brazil, plus a season in Italy, all in the 1990s and 2000s.
In 2017 he was appointed as the new head coach of the Brazil men's team, replacing Bernardo Rezende who was in office during the last sixteen years.

He was also disciplined by the FIVB when cameras clearly showed him intentionally rolling a ball on court mid rally. This was during an important 5th set in 2018 vs Russia. In his statement he failed to apologize for the incident or admit fault.

References

External links
 Profile

1960 births
Living people
Brazilian men's volleyball players
Olympic volleyball players of Brazil
Volleyball players at the 1980 Summer Olympics
Volleyball players at the 1984 Summer Olympics
Volleyball players at the 1988 Summer Olympics
Olympic silver medalists for Brazil
Olympic medalists in volleyball
Brazilian volleyball coaches
Medalists at the 1984 Summer Olympics
People from São Leopoldo
Pan American Games medalists in volleyball
Pan American Games gold medalists for Brazil
Volleyball players at the 1983 Pan American Games
Medalists at the 1983 Pan American Games
Outside hitters
Sportspeople from Rio Grande do Sul